Gargaon College, established in 1959, is a general degree college situated at Simaluguri, in Sibsagar district, Assam. It is affiliated with Dibrugarh University.

Activities
The college holds a debating competition every year on its foundation day, September 7th in memory of its first regular principal Tanu Konwar. Every year the college conducts general election among the students to form the Gargaon College Students' Union. The Students' Union organises annual sports and the Literary and Cultural Week of the college annually. The college has a NSS volunteer unit. Gargayan is the annual magazine of the college.

Departments

Science
Physics
Mathematics
Chemistry
Statistics
Geology
Botany
Zoology

Arts and Commerce
 Assamese
 English
History
Education
Economics
Rural Development
Political Science
Sociology
Geography
Commerce

References

External links
http://gargaoncollege.org/index.php

Universities and colleges in Assam
Colleges affiliated to Dibrugarh University
Educational institutions established in 1959
1959 establishments in Assam